Jean-Marc Bouju (born 1961) is a Los Angeles-based French photographer who won the World Press Photo of the Year award in 2004.

Early life and education 
Bouju was born in Les Sables d’Olonne, in France in 1961.

Has a masters degree in photojournalism from the University of Texas at Austin,  having first been connected to Texas via an internship from his local  University of Nice.

Career 
He has worked at the Daily Texan and the Associated Press where he won the Associated Press Managing Editors Award in 1995, 1996 and in 1997.

He has worked in Nicaragua, Rwanda, Liberia, Sierra Leone, Ethiopia, Eritrea, Zaire, and Iraq.

His photography of the Rwandan genocide co-won a 1995 Pulitzer prize for feature photography. In 1999, he was part of a team that won a Pulitzer prize for news photography for his photography of the 1998 United States embassy bombings.

In 2004, Bouju won the World Press Photo of the Year award for his 2003 photograph of US prisoner of war comforting his son while being held in near Najaf.

Personal life 
In 2003, Bouju was involved in a vehicle collision that damaged his spinal cord.

Bouju is based in Los Angeles where he lives with his wife and daughter.

References

External links 

 2004 World Press Photo of the Year winning photo
 

Living people
University of Texas at Austin alumni
1961 births
21st-century French photographers
20th-century French photographers
French emigrants to the United States
Pulitzer Prize for Feature Photography winners
Pulitzer Prize for Breaking News Reporting winners